Mind Reflection is a Swiss electronica music group that formed in 1994.  Their music is primarily in the trance and dance musical genres.  Shorter versions of two of their songs, "Da Roots (Folk Mix)" and "Remember December", are featured in Roxor Games' In the Groove dancing video game.

Officially, Mind Reflection was registered with the Swiss society for the rights of authors of musical work (SUISA Zurich) in 1998, when Mind Reflection also enrolled their selfproduced album "This World" which has been distributed through their own company "Audio Trade Laudan & Co." Actually about 70 songs are registered at the SUISA Zurich. Mind Reflection has also produced 4 tracks for a quite big gymnastic-group (i.e. on the horizontal bar) that became Swiss champion with one of these songs. Since signing up with Mp3.com in 1999, Mind Reflection got several songs placed in the subcharts. "In the Night" is the first song that reached the Top 40 overall in September 2002 with almost 2000 plays a day.

Albums 
This World (1998)
Escape from Inhumanity
Gone
All the Best
Forever Alone
In Search of the Paradise
Smiling Girls
Victory
This World
Wishes
When They Call
Waiting for the Future
Remember December
Creation of Life

"Da Roots" and "Remember December" are two of the band's best known songs. They are featured in the popular music video game In the Groove.
"Da Roots" is a Celtic/Electronic song.

External links 
Mind Reflection's Website
Mind Reflection at Soundclick.com
Mind Reflection at Download.com

Swiss electronic music groups